Confess, Doctor Corda is a 1958 West German crime film directed by Josef von Báky and starring Hardy Krüger, Elisabeth Müller and Lucie Mannheim. It is considered to be a film noir, one of a number made in Germany during the decade. It was shot at the Spandau Studios. The film's sets were designed by the art directors Erich Kettelhut and Helmut Nentwig.

A Doctor goes to a meet a young woman in a park at night, only to find that she has been murdered before he got there. The police consider him the prime suspect, and put him under considerable pressure to confess.

Cast
 Hardy Krüger as Dr. Fred Corda
 Elisabeth Müller as Beate Corda
 Lucie Mannheim as Mrs. Bieringer
 Hans Nielsen as Dr. Nagel
 Fritz Tillmann as Dr. Pohlhammer
 Eva Pflug as Gabriele Montag
 Rudolf Fernau as Professor Schliessmann
 Siegfried Lowitz as Inspektor Guggitz
 Emmy Burg as Oberin
 Lore Hartling as Schwester Antonia
 Paul Edwin Roth as Dr. Schimmer
 Ernst Sattler as Vater von Corda
 Albert Bessler as Dr. Dollheubel
 Jochen Blume as Untersuchungsrichter
 Alfred Balthoff as Detektiv Juch
 Roma Bahn as Ehemalige Krankenschwester
 Werner Buttler as Dr. Feldmacher
 Reinhard Kolldehoff as Kriminalbeamter Kerndl
 Georg Gütlich as Polizeiarzt Dr. Gruber
 Hans Binner as Mörder
 Sigrid Hackenberg as Schwester Emerentia
 Ursula Hoeflich as Schwester Veronika
 Maria Krasna as Frau im Carmen-Kostüm
 Barbara Wieczik as Susi Corda

References

Bibliography 
 Spicer, Andrew. Historical Dictionary of Film Noir. Scarecrow Press, 2010.

External links 
 

1958 films
West German films
German crime films
German black-and-white films
1958 crime films
1950s German-language films
Films directed by Josef von Báky
Films produced by Horst Wendlandt
Films about miscarriage of justice
Crime films based on actual events
Films shot at Spandau Studios
1950s German films